Little Women is a British television mini-series broadcast by the BBC from 1950 to 1951 in six parts. An adaptation by Winifred Oughton and Brenda R. Thompson of Louisa May Alcott's 1868-69 two-volume novel Little Women.

The lost series was broadcast live and the transmissions were not recorded.

The production was the first adaptation of the novel by the BBC. There were later adaptations in 1958, 1970 and 2017.

Plot summary

Cast List 
 Meg March - Sheila Shand Gibbs
 Jo March - Jane Hardie
 Beth March -  Norah Gorsen
 Laurie -  David Jacobs
 Hannah Mullet - Anita Sharp-Bolster
 Amy March - Susan Stephen
 Mrs. March - Barbara Everest
 Mr. James Laurence - Wensley Pithey
 John Brooke - Alan Bromly
 Aunt March - Violet Gould
 Mr. March - Arthur Ridley

Production Team

Writing 
 Louisa May Alcott (6 episodes, 1950-1951)
 Winifred Oughton (6 episodes, 1950-1951)
 Brenda R. Thompson (6 episodes, 1950-1951)

Series Production Design 
 Stephen Taylor (6 episodes, 1950-1951)
 Lawrence Broadhouse (2 episodes, 1951)

Producer 
 Pamela Brown (6 episodes, 1950-1951)

Episode list

References

External links
 

1950 British television series debuts
1951 British television series endings
1950s British drama television series
Black-and-white British television shows
English-language television shows
Television series about the American Civil War
British live television series
Lost television shows
BBC television dramas
1950s British television miniseries
Television series based on Little Women